Anders Joachim Kurtén (1836–1899) was born in Kronoby into the family of sea captain Henrik Kurtén. In 1841 the family moved to Vaasa where he finished his upper-secondary final examination at the age of 17. He went on to study at a business college in Turku after which he went to work as a clerk for businessman A.A. Levón back in Vaasa. In 1861 he became Levóns business partner. 

Joachim Kurtén became a prominent figure in Vaasa, where he founded several companies and had a distinguished career in banking. He chaired the city council for almost twenty years and was the speaker of the Burghers in Finland’s then legislature, the four-estates Diet.

The fact that the railroad extends to Vaasa is supposed to be the work of Joachim Kurtén.

1836 births
1899 deaths
People from Kronoby
Swedish-speaking Finns
Members of the Diet of Finland
19th-century Finnish businesspeople
Finnish bankers